Gordon Bennett is a comic book character, who appeared in The Beano (but previously the Beezer Annuals), and is named after the exclamation 'Gordon Bennett'. The character originally appeared between 1999 and 2000, originally drawn by Jimmy Hansen who had previously drawn First Class. he appeared as a "Guest Star", but returned after a five-year hiatus, in issue 3281, dated 4 June 2005, Drawn by Robert Leighton, creators of Ridge Rescue 4. He plays pranks on Mr Nifty, the neighbour who hates him, as a result of which he shouts "Gordon Bennett!". Their relationship is similar to what the American Dennis the Menace does to his grumpy neighbour Mr. Wilson. He was running to be voted to stay in the comic but lost with Tricky Dicky and Inspector Horse and Jocky. The Three Bears won. 

With the 2005 run, Mr Nifty's name was changed to Mr NIMBY (a popular acronym for "Not in My Back Yard").  

Beano strips